WJKI (1320 AM) is a radio station broadcasting a classic rock format. Licensed to Salisbury, Maryland, United States, the station is owned by Edwin G. Andrade, through licensee The Voice Radio, LLC, and features programming from Westwood One.

On November 21, 2018, the then-WICO changed their format from regional Mexican to a simulcast of classic rock-formatted WJKI-FM 103.5 FM Bethany Beach, DE, branded as "The Vault". The station changed its call sign to WJKI on November 30, 2018.

Translators

References

External links

FCC History Cards for WJKI

JKI (AM)
Classic rock radio stations in the United States
Radio stations established in 1957
1957 establishments in Maryland